This is a list of all the United States Supreme Court cases from volume 531 of the United States Reports:

External links

2000 in United States case law
2001 in United States case law